Together is an international lifestyle magazine based in Brussels, Belgium. The magazine is published ten times per year, and was created in 2006 by Jérôme Stéfanski.

Distribution
The magazine prints around 20,000 copies of every issue, which are distributed by hosts and hostesses in the environs of Brussels' European institutions such as the European Parliament.

Publisher
In 2008, David McGowan became the magazine's publisher.

Editors
James Drew was the magazine's first editor, from 2007 onwards, and he was joined by his business partner Colin Moors from 2008 to 2010. Drew left the position in May 2011, though Moors and Drew still contribute articles regularly. Drew was followed by Patricia Kelly as editor. Paul Morris succeeded Kelly in October 2012.

Features
The magazine features interviews with entertainers, fashion designers, politicians, and entrepreneurs. It also offers articles and editorials relating to themes such as the European Union, high-class fashion, health, travel, restaurants, achieving success in life, seduction, going out, cinema and culture.

References

External links
 Together Online.

2006 establishments in Belgium
English-language magazines
Lifestyle magazines
Magazines established in 2006
Magazines published in Brussels
Ten times annually magazines